Jim Canfield (born 13 March 1958) is a former Australian rules footballer who played with Carlton in the Victorian Football League (VFL).

Notes

External links 

Jim Canfield's profile at Blueseum

1958 births
Carlton Football Club players
Living people
Australian rules footballers from Victoria (Australia)